Helcystogramma melanocarpa is a moth in the family Gelechiidae. It was described by Edward Meyrick in 1929. It is found in North America, where it has been recorded from Nova Scotia to New Brunswick to South Carolina and to Texas.

The wingspan is about 11 mm. The forewings are ochreous whitish sprinkled with grey. The stigmata form roundish black spots, the second discal largest, the plical slightly before the first discal. There is a marginal series of black dots around the apex and termen. The hindwings are light grey, paler towards the base. Adults are on wing from March to August.

References

Moths described in 1929
melanocarpa
Moths of North America